The Newcastle Customs House is a heritage listed building located on the corner of Bond and Watt Street in Newcastle in New South Wales, Australia. The building was designed in the Italianate Renaissance Revival style by New South Wales Colonial Architect, James Barnet, in 1877, with a wing added in matching materials in 1899 under the direction of Walter Liberty Vernon. It now operates as the Customs House Hotel.

 History 
From the later 1820s free traders were operating in the Newcastle harbour, primarily shipping coal and later wool and cedar. The first Customs Officer-cum-Pilot came to Newcastle in 1827 and is believed to have operated from a cottage on a sandbank somewhere in the Hunter River. A succession of temporary buildings were used to house the Customs Official in the following years including the old Sessions House in Church Street (from  1839) and the Miners Arms Inn in Market Square. None were satisfactory.

In 1846 Newcastle was declared a free port and a despatch conveying this information stated that local authorities were, 'to take the necessary Measures for promulgating the said order in the usual and most authoritative manner...'

In the same year Mr W. A. Scott's property, Newcastle House, was let to the government for use as a Customs House. This property stood on the south-eastern corner of Pacific Street and what later became Scott Street.

The supplementary estimates for the year contained an amount, one thousand pounds, for the erection of a purpose built building but it was some years before one was built.

Prior to the erection of the current Customs House there was considerable local agitation for a new building, the increase in shipping having placed great demands on the inadequate temporary facilities. During the later 1860s six thousand pounds was placed on the estimates for the purpose of building a new Customs House and tenders were called but nothing came of the move.

Immediately prior to the erection and subsequent occupation of the present Customs House, the Customs Department was located on the second floor of Dibb's, Thorne and Company's building situated on the corner of Scott and Bolton Streets. This building has since been demolished and replaced by the South British Insurance Company building.

A description from early 1874 of this temporary Customs House highlighted the need for a new building.

In January 1871 an announcement in the Maitland Mercury stated that erection of the new Custom House was underway by contractor, Mr Fox. The contract had been taken at 7,000 pounds and the building was to be completed within fifteen months from the time of signing the document. It is obvious, however, that the builder did not meet his obligations.

In 1873 new tenders were being called for erection of the Custom House. These were repeated in May 1874. By July 1874 a tender by Messrs Jennings and Pallister had been accepted. By October 1874 the contractors had enclosed the ground preparatory to erection of the new building. The site selected, and eventually built upon, may have been different to that originally selected as Sutherland had intimated in his parliamentary address. However, an anonymous letter to the Public Works Department in 1874 referred to the "quicksand bottom" of the new site which prevented establishment of a secure foundation. This appears to have been discounted by the authorities and the construction programme commenced as planned. The same letter also makes mention of an allocation of 15,000 pounds for the work but this has not been verified from any other source.

The original plans for the building no longer survive, however, these were retraced in 1932. The only outbuildings indicated were the WCs immediately behind the building. By the end of the financial year in 1874 1,100 pounds had been spent in construction, of an estimated total of 13,200 pounds.

In October 1876 the last stone was laid in the building and the contractors celebrated by holding a small party on the site, toasting each other and various other officials. The Union Jack and Ensign were hoisted to the top of the building.

The near completion of the Custom House was cause for one local newspaper to describe in considerable detail the building.

Although celebrations had been held for the final stone laying in 1876 the building was not completed until the following year. In January 1877 it was reported that the English and German ensigns had been raised on the spire of the Custom House. Between March and April 1877 the time ball was placed in position

By April 1877, however, many people were wondering why the new building, to all extents finished and habitable, had not been occupied. Finally, in November 1877, the new building opened for business, the barque "Jane Spiers" being the first vessel cleared from it.

At the end of 1877 a further 5,060 pounds, fifteen shillings and seven pence had been spent on constructing the building, 700 pounds, twelve shillings and nine pence on the furniture and 500 pounds on constructing the time ball.

Although the Customs House was officially opened in 1877 it may be seen that for a number of years after this, small additions and some fundamental items were made and added to the building. After this a period of what appears to have been a "settling in' occurred during which only minor repairs are recorded as having occurred.

In June 1878 tenders were let for construction of a dwarf wall around the site. In 1880 the dwarf wall and railing were finally finished at a total expenditure of 874 pounds.

During 1884 proposals were put forward for landscaping the grounds of the building although it seems likely that all of these, particularly the planting, did not occur.

In 1897 the decision to add an additional wing to the Custom House was made when a Royal Commission investigated management of the Hunter Board and recommended a piece of Crown land in this location be used as the site of the new offices. It was estimated a new building could be built for 4000 pounds. By the end of 1899 the new building was completed.

By 1915 the Hunter District Water and Sewerage Board had acquired new offices and vacated the Custom House wing.

In 1924 the clock was recommissioned.

During 1956 a major refurbishment was carried out.

In January 1959 a fire in the roof severely damaged that section and the two floors of the building. The damage was originally estimated at 10,000 pounds but had been re-evaluated by April 1959 at 13,000 pounds. At that time tenders were called for laying new slates.

In 1960 the building gained a new tenant when the Department of Works took over a substantial section of the upper floor. As a result, alterations, repairs and a thorough repainting of the area was carried out prior to the department moving in.

During 1962 the building again underwent a major refurbishing, mainly repainting. At the beginning of this year the main office, counter and scat backs in the public space, Nautical and Ships Surveyor's office, Superintendent's Office, Engineer and Ship Surveyor's office and Examination Room were all cleaned down and repainted.

It was not until 1963 that the roof was retiled with terra-cotta tiles. In 1968 a restoration process was carried out on the external stonework. This was achieved by removing the eroded sand and replacing it with a similarly coloured mixture of sand and a hard setting resin.

During 1968 the building was first classified by the National Trust of Australia (NSW). In 1970 a report was prepared on the condition of the previously treated external stonework. It was found to be "in a bad way". In the same report was the first indictment of the work in the previous years, which had damaged its integrity.

This appears to have had little effect because the works scheduled for 1971 included items such as the continued "renovation" of external stonework using the same compound, renovation of brickwork, replacement of timber gates on Watt Street with cyclone chain wire and replacement of the existing garage doors with aluminium shutters.

The growing awareness of the historical value of the building was highlighted in 1976 by celebrations marking its centenary. Customs officials re-enacted the original party held in the building to celebrate the final stone-laying and the media highlighted the building. In the same year a number of enquiries were made regarding historical facets of the building such as its clock.

In 1978 repairs included general maintenance as well as repainting the stairwell and staircase of the cast wing, miscellaneous rooms, Long Room and lower ground floor rear entrance lobby. In the same year concerns were expressed about the potential damage caused by blasting for harbour deepening.

During 1979 tests were carried out on the earlier stonework and brickwork restoration which was found to "have failed in almost all areas of application" and at the end of the year there were requests to restore the external brick and stone work.

During 1980 the first steps were taken towards establishing a schedule that would be sympathetic towards the historic value of the building. An inspection led to the recommendation that a management plan be prepared. In addition, investigations were to be carried out to determine how to remove the earlier bonding materials on the external masonry.

During 1981 work commenced on restoring the external stone and brickwork. The general maintenance works of 1983 included repainting the ground floor of the entrance lobby in an "original scheme", reinstatement of the original entrance and lobby doors and the clock tower hand rail and new light fittings for the entrance lobbies and hallways to the ground floor. The 1985 repair and maintenance programme recommended replacement of deteriorating terra-cotta tiles with Welsh slates and reinstatement of the iron palisade fence. More money was allocated for interior "restoration". There was also considerable debate and correspondence over restoring the time ball. The Company of Master Mariners' offered to restore it as a bicentenary project.

In December 1989 the Customs House suffered considerable damage during the 1989 Newcastle earthquake. Between 1990 and 1994 remediation works were carried out and substantial conservation works recommended in the 1987 Conservation Plan.

The drawings for works to Newcastle Customs House by the Department of Administrative Services for earthquake repair and reinforcement works included:
 reconstruction of earthquake damaged chimneys and reinforcement by filling flues with cement;
 steel bracing of the first and ground floor ceilings; &
 reinforcement of the tower with reinforced cement render

The Department of Administrative Services drawings for conservation and reconstruction works documented the following:
 internal demolition works including the demolition of many intrusive counters, cupboards and internal partitions;
 capping off and disconnecting existing extraneous plumbing and services demolition of part of the later toilet block behind the southern verandah demolition of the outbuildings located on the eastern section of the site;
 reconstruction of the eastern verandah, balustrade and stairs including windows in the western wall;
 a comprehensive stone repair, epoxy patching and replacement program reinstatement of original profile cornices, skirtings and architraves;
 new pendant lighting;
 new panelled doors to original details;
 revision of telephone, electrical, plumbing and fire services;
 new slate roof to the main wings and verandah;
 new copper gutters and downpipes;
 new paint scheme for exterior building elements;
 removal of ' the concrete paving from the stone on the southern verandah removal of some trees from the western side of the main building;
 new palisade fencing to existing stone columns and plinth wall; &
 new exposed aggregate paving to the site

In 1995, substantial alterations were carried out to convert it for use as a licensed cafe and function venue.

In 2018, the building is known as the Customs House Hotel. The hotel comprises a restaurant and bar on the lower level and a function room on the upper level.  

 Description 
The building is in the Italianate Renaissance Revival Style, characteristic of much of the work of James Barnet. Although the building evolved through two major construction phases the style of the north facing original wing has been faithfully carried through into the rear wing by the later architects under the direction of Government Architect W.L. Vernon. The result is completely harmonious and serves as an example of the right way to add to a building of high architectural distinction.

It is generally a two-storey masonry building planned along an elongated cast west axis. The building is terminated by a  tower at the western end and by a slightly projecting bay at the eastern end of the front elevation.

The building is constructed of dark cream brickwork with a battered sandstone plinth approximately two metres high, sandstone string course and projecting sandstone eaves brackets. The windows to the main street facing facades have carved stone reveals and are surmounted by semi-circular arches of alternating cream and black fire bricks. The windows of the "lesser" facades, facing into the rear courtyard have simple brick reveals and segmented sandstone arches and stone sills.

The western end has a  clock tower, lantern and time ball, one of three examples in Australia that are relatively intact. The time ball would fall at 1 pm every day until World War II, in which it was stopped to hide it from the enemy. The building has two floors and a basement area. 

The building comprises two floor levels and a basement area under the eastern end of the main building.

The ground floor area consists of a bar area, dining rooms, kitchen, gaming room and toilets. The first floor consists of conference rooms, bar areas, toilets and function rooms.

In the northern wing most of the internal spaces retain elements of the first phase of construction. Cedar window and door joinery survives as well as architraves and skirtings.

In the main ground floor rooms and public spaces the plaster ceilings and cornices remain relatively intact and at first floor level these elements generally have been reinstated during more recent restoration works.

The ground floor timbers were inspected from the underfloor space and were found to be intact. The upper floor timbers may be assumed to be intact judging from the unchanged state of the plaster ceilings below. Some modification of the upper floor boards would have occurred to enable installation of modern plumbing and electrical services.

The stair in the base of the tower is a winding cantilevered stone type with a very fine cedar handrail. The stair in the eastern end of the north wing is timber with plaster soffit, also having a cedar handrail.

In the rear wing the joinery and plaster details are different, being characteristic of the style at the turn of the century. The architraves and skirtings from this period are identified as Type 2 and the windows as Types 3 and 4 on the west and south facades and Types 5 and 6 on the east facade. The stair in this section is timber with a cedar handrail exhibiting a high standard of craftsmanship. Many of the ceilings to the rooms of the building have been restored to their original detail in the works undertaken between 1987 and 1999.

Most of the rooms have been repainted following a researched colour scheme. It is understood that the colours revealed by paint scrapings were modified to provide this scheme. Evidence of the original colours can be found on a section of the ground floor wall in the eastern stair lobby.

Many of the timber veneer and glass partitions dating from the later part of phase Ill described in the 1987 Plan have been removed and the original fabric has been restored.

Many of the original panelled doors on the upper floor of the building have been returned or restored.

Original/early features of the interior include:
 original room layout of the building;
 original plaster ceiling roses and intact original cornices;
 painted rendered plaster walls and original wall vents;
 timber framed floor structure and timber floor boards;
 timber skirtings and architraves;
 original timber doors and windows;
 timber staircases with original stairs, balusters and posts; &
 location of fireplaces.

The physical condition of the building was reported as good as at 24 July 2000.

 Heritage listing 
The Newcastle Customs House is historically, aesthetically, socially and scientifically significant as a public building designed by Colonial Architect James Barnet for the collection of customs duties. It represents a significant landmark in Newcastle with its distinctive Italianate Renaissance Revival design. The Customs House is an important element in the townscape of Newcastle and contributes strongly to the city's special sense of place. The visual relationship to the harbour and the city is significant and symbolises the associational relationship of the Customs House to the maritime and commercial history of Newcastle.

The building demonstrates a process and function: the administration of Customs and Excise. Areas in the building such as the Long Room are unique to the operation of Customs authorities (formerly at the upper level from 1877, and later at the south end ground level).

The architectural excellence of Barnet's original 1877 building, including external fabric and details, is largely intact. The 1899 wing was added sensitively by adopting almost identical materials and details.

Newcastle Customs House was listed on the New South Wales State Heritage Register on 14 July 2000 having satisfied the following criteria.The place is important in demonstrating the course, or pattern, of cultural or natural history in New South Wales.Newcastle Customs House has historic associations with the collection of customs duties in Newcastle in particular, and in New South Wales and Australia generally. When Newcastle was declared a free port in 1846 an amount of money was set aside for a purpose built building to be used as Newcastle's Customs House. The building was officially completed and opened in 1877 and has been continuously occupied since 1877. Areas in the building such as the Long Room are unique to the operation of Customs authorities (formerly at the upper level from 1877, and at present at the south end ground level).

The building was designed by the Colonial Architect James Barnet, one of Australia's most distinguished architects. Barnet designed it in the Italianate Renaissance Revival design with strong references to the Venetian Palazzo in the cantilevered bay windows of the north facade. The Italian Renaissance Revival Style is characteristic of much of Bamet's work.

Additions to the building were administered by another significant Government Architect, W. L. Vernon. Vernon carried the style of the original north facing wing through to the later rear wing. This results in a completely harmonious extension of the original building.

The Newcastle Customs House is historically significant as a landmark which can be seen from across the harbour at Stockton and from vanous points within the city centre. The visual relationship between Customs House and the harbour remains strong despite the effect of the reclamation of land to the north.

The time ball and clock are historically significant because they exhibit technical achievements of the late 19th century. The Time Ball has very strong associational value through its important function as an essential device for accurate navigation. It is one of the three examples of this rare type of late nineteenth century technology in Australia remaining almost intact.The place is important in demonstrating aesthetic characteristics and/or a high degree of creative or technical achievement in New South Wales.Since its original construction, the Customs House building has represented a landmark with its Italianate Renaissance Revival style of architecture, dark cream brickwork and sandstone construction and its distinctive  tower topped with the clock, lantern and time ball. Much of the fabric of the original 1877 Barnet building and the early 1899 Vemon wing represents a style of building and some methods of construction which are no longer used.

The visual relationship to the harbour and the city is significant and symbolises the associational relationship of the Customs House to the maritime and commercial history of Newcastle.

The building is an historic landmark. It is an important element in the townscape and contributes strongly to the city's special sense of place.The place has strong or special association with a particular community or cultural group in New South Wales for social, cultural or spiritual reasons.The setting and fabric of the Customs House building is held in high esteem by the community of Newcastle. The building is listed on major registers of places of heritage significance at local, state and federal levels. The range and extent of the public's interest in Newcastle Customs House is likely to increase with better public education about the value of historic buildings as repositories of information about past design and construction practices.

The buildings and grounds have special cultural, social, aesthetic and educational values by virtue of links with present and past individuals, the community and the potential for research and education.

The Customs House has been a prominent feature of the landscape of the Newcastle foreshore for more than 130 years. It provides tangible evidence of a process and function i.e. the administration of Customs and Excise. Areas in the building such as the Long Room are unique to the operation of Customs authorities.

The buildings and grounds have special cultural, social, aesthetic and educational values by virtue of links with present and past individuals, the community and the potential for research and education.

Newcastle Customs House provides a permanent link with the past and is significant to the past and present community's sense of place.The place has potential to yield information that will contribute to an understanding of the cultural or natural history of New South Wales.The site retains very little above ground to illustrate the phases of development except for the Customs House building and the stone fence posts and reconstructed palisade fence. The archaeological potential of the site is high. There is a strong probability that traces of the convict stockade extend below the surface into the western section of the site. Substantial archaeological evidence relating to the first and later W.C.s as well as other outbuildings is likely to be located in the central car park area.

The time ball and clock exhibit technical achievements of the late 19th century. The Time Ball has very strong associational value through its important function as an essential device for accurate navigation. The time ball is one of the three examples of this rare type of late nineteenth century technology in Australia remaining almost intact.The place possesses uncommon, rare or endangered aspects of the cultural or natural history of New South Wales.'''

Newcastle Customs House is a rare example of a 19th-century building which has many of the original 1877 features and early 1899 features intact. It is a rare example of a government complex designed by the Colonial Architect, James Barnet and additions administered by the Government Architect W L Vernon.

References

Bibliography

Attribution

External links

James Barnet buildings
Victorian architecture in New South Wales
Customs House
Customs houses in Australia
Hotels in New South Wales
Customs House
New South Wales State Heritage Register
Walter Liberty Vernon buildings
Articles incorporating text from the New South Wales State Heritage Register
1877 establishments in Australia
Buildings and structures completed in 1877